The Sérieuse was a Magicienne class frigate of the French Navy, launched in 1779.

Career

In 1781, Sérieuse ferried soldiers after the Invasion of Minorca.

She was at Toulon when the Coalition captured the city. When they left, on 18 December 1793, they attempted to burn her. However, the French managed to extinguish the fire and save the ship.

On 9 June 1794, Sérieuse captured HMS Speedy off Nice.

In 1798, she took part in the Expedition of Egypt, and in the Battle of the Nile. She attempted to reinforce the crew of Tonnant by sending 150 men of her own crew. The next night, 1 August 1798, HMS Orion sank Sérieuse.

Citations and references
Citations

References
Winfield, Rif & Stephen S Roberts (2015) French Warships in the Age of Sail 1786 - 1861: Design Construction, Careers and Fates. (Seaforth Publishing). 

Serieuse
1779 ships
Ships built in France
Maritime incidents in 1798
Shipwrecks of Egypt
Shipwrecks in the Mediterranean Sea